List of most distant supernovae contains selected examples of supernovae so far discovered.

Most distant supernovae

Most distant supernovae by type

See also
List of largest cosmic structures
List of the most distant astronomical objects
List of supernovae

References

External links
 Up to date list of the most distant known supernovae at the Open Supernova Catalog

Most distant
Most distant supernovae
Supernovae, most distant